Minuscule 707 (in the Gregory-Aland numbering), ε152 (von Soden), is a Greek minuscule manuscript of the New Testament, on parchment. Palaeographically it has been assigned to the 11th century. The manuscript is lacunose. Scrivener labelled it by 606e.

Description 

The codex contains the text of the four Gospels on 150 parchment leaves (size ), 
with only one small lacuna in Mark 16:19-20 (after και).

The text is written in one column per page, 27 lines per page. It has ornamental headpieces and decorated initials.

It contains  subscriptions (to Matthew), and pictures. It has a few lectionary markings on the margin added by a later hand.

According to Scrivener it has "a very unusual style".

Text 

The Greek text of the codex is a representative of the Byzantine text-type. Hermann von Soden classified it to the textual family Kx.  Kurt Aland placed it in Category V.

According to the Claremont Profile Method it represents mixed Byzantine text, related to the textual family Kx in Luke 1 and Luke 20. In Luke 10 no profile was made.

The texts of Matthew 16:2b–3, John 5:3.4, Pericope Adulterae (John 8:3-8:11) are marked with an obelus.

History 

Scrivener and Gregory dated the manuscript to the 11th century. Currently the manuscript is dated by the INTF to the 11th century.

The manuscript was held n Constantinople, where it was bought in 1882.

It was added to the list of New Testament manuscript by Scrivener (606) and Gregory (707). Gregory saw the manuscript in 1883.

Actually the manuscript is housed at the Bodleian Library (MS. Auct. T. inf. 2. 6) in Oxford.

See also 

 List of New Testament minuscules
 Biblical manuscript
 Textual criticism

References

Further reading

External links 
 MSS. Auctarium at the Bodleian Library

Greek New Testament minuscules
11th-century biblical manuscripts
Bodleian Library collection